AGC Aréna Na Stínadlech is a multi-purpose stadium in Teplice, Czech Republic.  It is currently used mostly for football matches and is the home ground of FK Teplice.  The stadium holds 18,221 and was built in 1973. The Czech Republic national football team often plays qualification games at the stadium and has very positive statistics there. As of October 2010, they have won 18 times from 19 games, drawing the other, in a 2002 friendly game against Sweden where they tied 3–3.

In the 2010–11 season, FK Ústí nad Labem ground-shared at Na Stinadlech because their Městský stadion stadium did not meet league criteria.

International matches
Stadion Na Stínadlech has hosted 13 competitive and 7 friendly matches of the Czech Republic national football team.

References

External links 
 Photo gallery at Erlebnis-stadion.de
 Info about stadium

FK Teplice
Sport in Teplice
Football venues in the Czech Republic
Czech First League venues
Multi-purpose stadiums in the Czech Republic
Buildings and structures in the Ústí nad Labem Region
Sports venues completed in 1973
1973 establishments in Czechoslovakia
20th-century architecture in the Czech Republic